This is a list of known Taínos, some of which were caciques (male and female tribal chiefs). Their names are in ascending alphabetical order and the table may be re-sorted by clicking on the arrows in the column header cells.

The Taínos were the indigenous inhabitants of the Bahamas, Greater Antilles, and some of the Lesser Antilles – especially in Guadeloupe, Dominica and Martinique. The Taínos ("Taíno" means "relatives"), unlike the Caribs (who practiced regular raids on other groups), were peaceful seafaring people and distant relatives of the Arawak people of South America.

Taíno society was divided into two classes: Nitainos (nobles) and the Naborias (commoners). Both were governed by chiefs known as caciques, who were the maximum authority in a Yucayeque (village). The chiefs were advised by priest-healers known as Bohiques and the Nitaynos, which is how the elders and warriors were known.

This is an incomplete list, which may never be able to satisfy particular standards for completeness. Anyone can help by expanding it with reliably sourced entries.

See also

List of Notable Puerto Ricans
List of Notable Cubans
List of Notable Dominicans (Dominican Republic)
List of Notable Haitians
List of Notable Bahamians
List of Notable Jamaicans
Taínos
Tibes Indigenous Ceremonial Center

References

Taíno
Tainos
Indigenous Caribbean people
Puerto Rico-related lists
Cuba-related lists
Dominican Republic-related lists
Haiti-related lists
Bahamas-related lists
Jamaica-related lists